Deh-e Gowd (also Romanized as Deh Gowd; also known as Allāhābād, Deh-e Gowdāl, Deh Goo, Deh-i-Gāv, and Deh Ka’ū) is a village in Jazmurian Rural District, Jazmurian District, Rudbar-e Jonubi County, Kerman Province, Iran. At the 2006 census, its population was 413, in 92 families.

References 

Populated places in Rudbar-e Jonubi County